Terzaghi may refer to:
 The House of Terzaghi von Pontenuovo
 Anton von Terzaghi
 Karl (Anton) Terzaghi, Edler von Pontenuovo (1883 - 1963), an Austrian civil engineer and geologist
 Terzaghi's Principle
 Terzaghi Dam, Whistler, British Columbia in western Canada
 Manuel Terzaghi (born 1992)
 Villa Terzaghi, Robecco sul Naviglio

References 

Italian-language surnames
Italian noble families
Austrian noble families